Forest Beach may refer to:

 North and South Forest Beach, on Hilton Head Island, South Carolina
 Forrest Beach, Queensland, 12 miles east of Ingham, Queensland